Edgar Garrison Holt (July 2, 1874 – April 19, 1924) was an American college football coach. He served as the head football coach at the University of Illinois at Urbana–Champaign from 1901 to 1902, compiling a record of 18–4–1. Holt was born on July 2, 1874, in Lawrence, Massachusetts.

Head coaching record

References

1874 births
1924 deaths
19th-century players of American football
American football tackles
Illinois Fighting Illini football coaches
Princeton Tigers football players
Sportspeople from Lawrence, Massachusetts